Nqobizitha "Enqore" Mlilo is a Zimbabwean video director, animator, new media artist and educator from Bulawayo, based in Harare. He released Zimbabwe's first fully animated music video in 2002 at the age of 18 for artist/presenter, Babongile, while still based in his home town, Bulawayo.

Early life and education
Enqore was born in Bulawayo, Zimbabwe and is of Shangani descent. He went to Milton Junior and Senior School for his primary and secondary education respectively. He moved to Harare in 2006 and studied Graphic Design at ZIVA. Since moving to Harare, he has provided animation for over 40 music videos, and a number of short films, commercials and documentaries. He has also worked as an educator in the animation industry in Zimbabwe, regionally and abroad.

Career

Educator
Up until 2015, Enqore has trained over 200 digital media artists as a lecturer in 3D animation at the Zimbabwe Institute of Vigital Arts (ZIVA) for five years. He was a student at ZIVA before he returned there to lecture. He is also a contributor of online 3D tutorials for Pixel Logic Corp based in California. Enqore was also integral in the design and initial set-up and implementation of the foundational curriculum for Africa's biggest digital media school (WDA) in Kigali, Rwanda. In addition, he has also facilitated a wealth of workshops around Zimbabwe as well as mentored a number of students and creative individuals in Zimbabwe and abroad.

Animator
Enqore released his first animated project in 2002, in the form of an animated music video for Zimbabwean musician and presenter, Babongile. Since then, Enqore has created over 25 animated videos ranging from personal projects to commercial work. In regards to CG, early on in his career Enqore was primarily focused on developing his 3D animation skill sets. He used 3D software applications such as Softimage XSI and Maxon Cinema 4D. In 2014 he began spending extensive time in The Foundry's MODO 3D software. Nqobizitha also invested a large amount of time into developing 2D animation skill sets. His primary 2D Animation software is Anime Studio Pro. Enqore continues to stress test the different animation pipelines and educates other digital media artists in and around Zimbabwe on 2D and 3D animation.

Video production and visual effects
Enqore taught himself video production out of necessity and rose to become a leader in the industry. He made his name as a video director through filming and producing over 40 music videos. He has also shot a number of mini documentaries including the Shoko 13 Festival documentary as well as a documentary on Zimbabwean hip hop poet Outspoken. Since starting Nafuna in 2012, he has produced over 80 videos. Notable productions include Tonight With Zororo, a Zimbabwean urban current affairs talk show, The Nafuna Show, an African variety magazine show, as well as 263Urban, a documentary series on Zimbabwean urban music. Enqore is also a Visual Effects Artist and has produced VFX tests and videos.

Music
Enqore worked with Solomon Maramba (Undadaug), together creating an animated hip-hop band called the untouchables in 2008, and were later joined by Tinman. They released two music videos online on social networks and video broadcast sites like YouTube.  Later Enqore started working on an Internet mixtape, Ctrl-alt-Del, which was released online in 2009 free.

Angry Mwana
Enqore has also written and directed Angry Mwana, Zimbabwe's leading animated series.

Nafuna
Nafuna Investments P/L was founded by Nqobizitha Mlilo in July 2012 and is a young multi-award winning digital media start-up organization in Zimbabwe.  Nafuna operates in three main areas; Studio Nafuna is at the heart of the Nafuna brand.  The studio focuses on delivering high quality digital media services to its clients.  Studio Nafuna provides Digital video production, digital design, Animation and visual effects services.  Their second area of influence is content creation under the brand NafunaTV. Under this brand they create television shows, documentaries and viral videos for the African and international audience at large. Thirdly, the company places emphasis on the development of the African digital media industry. This is done through Nafuna Campus, the company's educational initiative where the aim is to educate at least 100 digital media artists a year.

Awards
 2012 ICT Achievers Award for best Animation and Computer Graphics
 2014 Google's Top 10 African Innovators using the internet to change lives
 2014 Zimdancehall Award for Best Music Video (Winky D's Vashakabvu)
 2015 National Arts Merit Award (NAMA) for Best Music Video (Changamire - Visual Effects)

References
Notes

Bibliography
 Google Top 10 Innovator 
 Article on Itamari 
 Article in Groove Magazine 
 Article on POVO

External links
 
 
 Personal website 
 Nafuna website 

Living people
1984 births